Dabarre (also known as Af-Dabarre) is a Somali language spoken by the Dabarre and Iroole both sub-clans of the Digil clan family of Somalis inhabiting southwestern Somalia. It has an estimated 23,000 speakers. Dialects include Dabarre and Iroole (Af-Iroole).

References

Omo–Tana languages
Languages of Somalia